Ridicule may refer to:

 A form of mockery
 Appeal to ridicule, an informal fallacy which presents an opponent's argument as absurd
 Ridiculous, to be something which is highly incongruous or inferior
 Ridicule (film), a 1996 French film set in the 18th century
 "Ridicule", a song by the Kleptones from A Night at the Hip Hopera

See also

 Ridiculous (disambiguation)
 Ridiculousness (disambiguation)